HB Dudelange is a handball club from Dudelange, Luxembourg, that plays in the Luxembourgish Handball League.

Men's team

Titles 

 Sales Lentz League
 Winners (23) : 1962, 1964, 1965, 1966, 1967, 1968, 1969, 1970, 1971, 1972, 1973, 1976, 1977, 1980, 1981, 1984, 1985, 1986, 1992, 2008, 2009, 2012, 2015

 Luxembourg Handball Cup
 Winners (18) : 1962, 1964, 1966, 1967, 1968, 1969, 1970, 1972, 1973, 1977, 1979, 1981, 1985, 1986, 1988, 1991, 1999, 2013

European record

Current squad 
Squad for the 2016–17 season

Goalkeepers
 Thierry Hensen
 Mika Herrmann 
 Mladen Jovicic 

Wingers
RW
  Denis Della Schiava 
  Tom Klohe
LW 
  Kim Bosoni
  Gledis Kryeziu
  Romuald Kunda Murera
  Tommy Wirtz
Line players 
  Mario Anic
  Dan Mauruschatt
  Jean Christoph Schmale
  Ben Schuster

Back players
LB
  Martin Hummel 
  Joe Moret
  Malvin Sebastian Patzack
CB 
  Dean Joseph Beissac
  Michel Gulbicki 
  Frank Hippert 
  Yann Hippert 
RB
  Josip Ilic

Women's team

Titles 

 Sales Lentz League
 Winners (11) : 1974, 1975, 1976, 1977, 1988, 2010, 2011, 2013, 2014, 2015, 2016

 Luxembourg Handball Cup
 Winners (12) : 1975, 1977, 1982, 1983, 1987, 1990, 1998, 2010, 2013, 2014, 2015, 2016

European record

Current squad 
Squad for the 2016–17 season

Goalkeepers
 Jessica Damy
 Malgorzata Daufeld-Kawka 
 Mélissa Gaspard 

Wingers
RW
  Mara Odile Lisarelli 
  Joy Mockel
  Tania Silvestrucci
LW 
  Svenia Gambini
  Claudine Schaffener
Line players 
  Corinne Damy
  Lisa Scheuer
  Kim Thies
  Fabienne Thiry

Back players
LB
  Joy Wirtz 
CB 
  Sharon Dickes
  Kim Wirtz 
RB
  Barbara Hajduk
  Joy Krier
  Sally Tritz

External links
Official website 

HB Dudelange
Dudelange